Syrian Arabic refers to any of the Arabic varieties spoken in Syria, or specifically to Levantine Arabic.

Aleppo, Idlib, and Coastal dialects

Aleppo and surroundings 
Characterized by the imperfect with a-: ašṛab ‘I drink’, ašūf ‘I see’, and by a pronounced ʾimāla of the type sēfaṛ/ysēfer, with subdialects:

 Muslim Aleppine
 Christian Aleppine
 Rural dialects similar to Muslim Aleppine
 Mountain dialects
 Rural dialects
 Bēbi (əlBāb)
 Mixed dialects

Idlib and surroundings 
These dialects are transitional between the Aleppine and the Coastal and Central dialects. They are characterized by *q > ʔ, ʾimāla of the type the type sāfaṛ/ysēfer and ṣālaḥ/yṣēliḥ, diphthongs in every position, a- elision (+t > , but +it > ),  type perfect, ʾimāla in reflexes of *CāʔiC, and vocabulary such as  "plow sole".

Coast and coastal mountains
These dialects are characterized by diphthongs only in open syllables: bēt/bayti ‘house/my house’, ṣōt/ṣawti ‘voice/my voice’, but ā is found in many lexemes for both *ay and *aw (sāf, yām). There is pronounced ʾimāla. Unstressed a is elided or raised to i and u whenever possible: +t > , +it > , +it > , +t > , +ayt > , +t > , * >  > , * > . It can be divided into several subdialects:

 Transitional between Idlib and the northern coastal dialects
 Northern coastal dialects (Swaydīye)
 Northern coastal dialects
 Lattakia
 Central coastal dialects
 Mḥardi
 Banyās
 Southern coastal dialects
 Tartūs, Arwad
 Alawite and Ismaelite dialects

Central dialects 
In this area, predominantly *ay, aw > ē, ō. Mostly, there is no ʾimāla, and a-elision is only weakly developed. Word-final *-a > -i operates. Several dialects exist in this area:

Central-North 
Leans toward the Idlib and Coastal dialects. Preservation of *q, 2nd masc. inti, 2nd fem. inte, feminine forms in the plural , .

Tayybet əlʔImām / Sōrān 
The perfect of the primae alif verbs are ake, axe. In the imperfect, yāka, yāxa. The participle is mēke.

Hama 
Characterized by *q > ʔ; preservation of *ǧ; six short vowels: a, ǝ, e, i, o, u, and six long vowels: ā, ǟ, ē, ī, ō, ū.

Central-South w/ *q > q 
Preservation of *q.

Central-South w/ *q > ʔ 
Characterized by *q > ʔ.

Bedouin-Sedentary mixed dialect 
Preservation of interdentals and terms like alhaz "now".

Central Syrian dialect continuum, steppe dialects and steppe's edge

Suxni 
Characterized by *q > k, *g > c [ts], *k > č, and ʾimāla of type *lisān > lsīn. Distinctive pronouns are 3pl.c. aham and 2sg.f. suffix -či. The suffix of the verbal 3sg a-Type is -at, and i-Type perfects take the form ʾílbis "he got dressed".

Palmyrene 
Characterized by preserved *q, *g > č, and unconditioned ʾimāla in hēda. Distinctive pronouns are 3pl. ahu - hinna, and 2sg.f. suffix -ki. The suffix of the verbal 3sg a-Type is -at, and i-Type perfects take the form ʾílbis "he got dressed".

Qarawi 
Characterized by preserved *q and unconditioned ʾimāla in hēda. Distinctive pronouns are 3pl. hunni - hinni. The suffix of the verbal 3sg a-Type is -at, and i-Type perfects take the form lbīs "he got dressed".

Saddi 
Characterized by preserved *q and pronouns 3pl. hūwun - hīyin. The suffix of the verbal 3sg a-Type is -at.

Rastan 
Characterized by preserved *q and the changes masaku > masakaw# and masakin > masake:n# in pause. Distinctive pronouns are 3pl.c. hinne, and the suffix of the verbal 3sg a-Type is -at.

Nabki 
Characterized by *q > ʔ, and *ay, *aw > ā. The shifts *CaCC > CiCC/CuCC and *CaCaC > CaCōC take place. The ʾimāla is of the i-umlaut type. Distinctive pronouns are 2sg.f. suffix -ke. The a-Type perfects take the form ḍarōb and the i-type lbēs. The suffix of the verbal 3sg a-Type is -et, with allophony ḍarbet - ḍárbatu.

Eastern Qalamūn 
Characterized by *q > ʔ and ʾimāla of the i-umlaut type. Distinctive pronouns are 3sg.m. suffix -a/-e. The suffix of the verbal 3sg a-Type is -at.

Mʿaḏ̣ḏ̣amīye 
Characterized by *q > ʔ and unconditioned ʾimāla in hēda. Distinctive pronouns are 2sg.f. suffix -ki. The 1sg perfect conjugation is of the type , similar to the qǝltu dialects of Iraq. Also like qǝltu dialects, it has lengthened forms like ṣafṛā "yellow [fem.]".

Qalamūn 
The Qalamūn dialects have strong links to Central Lebanese. The short vowels i/u are found in all positions. Pasual kbīr > # and yrūḥ > yrawḥ#. The a-elision is not strongly pronounced. Shortening of unstressed long vowels is characteristic: *sakākīn > sakakīn ‘knives’, fallōḥ/fillaḥīn ‘peasant/peasants’, or fillōḥ/filliḥīn, as in Northwest Aramaic. Conservation of diphthongs and *q > ʔ are common, as well as splitting of ā into ē and ō. As for negation, the type mā- -š is already attested along with the simple negation.

Qara 
No interdentals

Yabrūdi 
No interdentals

Central Qalamūn 
Conservation of interdentals, subdialects:

 ʿĒn itTīne
 Central, tends to East Qalamūn
 Rās ilMaʿarra
 Gubbe
 Baxʿa
 Maʿlūla
 GubbʿAdīn

Southern Qalamūn 
Conservation of interdentals, a-elision +t > , distinctive pronouns are 3pl.c. . Subdialects are:

 
 ʿAkawbar, Tawwane, Hile
 Hafīr ilFawqa, Badda
 Qtayfe
 Sēdnāya
 Maʿarrit Sēdnāya
 Rankūs
 Talfita
 Halbūn
 Hafīr itTahta
 itTall
 Mnin
 Drayj

Northern Barada valley 
No interdentals, conservation of diphthongs

 Sirgāya
 Blūdān
 izZabadāni
 Madāya

Damascus and surroundings

Transitional Damascus - Qalamūn 
These dialects have no interdentals, no diphthongs, and a reflex of *g > ž. The suffix of the verbal 3sg a-Type is -it,  ḍarab+it > ḍárbit. The short vowels i/u are found in all positions. Demonstrative plural pronoun .

Damascus

Other dialects, accents, and varieties

Horan dialects 
The Hauran area is split between Syria and Jordan and speak largely the same dialect
 Central dialects
 Gēdūri (transitional)
 Mountain dialects
 Zāwye (transitional)
 Mixed dialect Čanāčer/Zāčye

Mount Hermon and Jabal idDrūz area 
Dialects of Mount Hermon and Druze have a Lebanese origin
 Autochthonous sedentary dialects
 Mount Hermon dialect
 Druze dialect

Sedentary East Syrian

Mesopotamian (Turkey) 
 Qsōrāni
 Tall Bēdar
 Mardilli
 Azxēni (ǝlMālkīye)

Mesopotamian (Syria) 

 Dēr izZōr
 Albū Kmāl

Autochthonous 

 Xātūnī

Bedouin dialects 
Shawi Arabic and Najdi Arabic are also spoken in Syria.

References

External links 

Arabic
Mashriqi Arabic